This is a list of episodes for the television series McMillan & Wife. For the sixth season, the "Wife" was killed off and the title was shortened to McMillan. The pilot episode was 120 minutes, seasons 1-2 were 90-minute episodes, season 3 had both 90- and 120-minute episodes, seasons 4-5 were 120-minute episodes, and season 6 had 90-minute episodes.

All six seasons of this series have been released on DVD.

Series overview

Episodes

Season 1 (1971–72)

Season 2 (1972–73)

Season 3 (1973–74)

Season 4 (1974–75)
Series moves to 120-minute episodes.

Season 5 (1975–76)

Season 6 (1976–77)
Series returns to 90-minute episodes and retitled McMillan.

References

External links
 

Lists of American crime drama television series episodes
Lists of American action television series episodes